Charles Pasquale Greco (October 29, 1894 – January 20, 1987) was an American prelate of the Roman Catholic Church. He served as bishop of the Diocese of Alexandria in Louisiana from 1946 to 1973. 

Greco also served as the supreme chaplain of the Knights of Columbus from 1961 to 1987.

Biography

Early life 
Charles Greco was born on October 29, 1894, in Rodney, Mississippi, to Frank and Carmela (née Testa) Greco. He attended St. Joseph Seminary in Covington, Louisiana, before studying at the American College at Louvain in Belgium and the University of Fribourg in Switzerland. 

Greco was ordained to the priesthood for the Archdiocese of New Orleans by Archbishop John Shaw on July 25, 1918. Greco served as vicar general of the archdiocese  and pastor of Our Lady of Lourdes Parish in New Orleans.

Bishop of Alexandria 
On January 15, 1946, Greco was appointed the sixth bishop of the Diocese of Alexandria by Pope Pius XII. He received his episcopal consecration on February 25, 2946, from Archbishop Joseph Rummel, with Bishops Richard Gerow and Thomas Toolen serving as co-consecrators. 

During his tenure, Greco established 33 parishes, over 125 churches and chapels, 100 convents and rectories, and 7 health-care facilities. In 1954, he also founded St. Mary's Residential Training School in Clarks, Louisiana, and Holy Angels Residential Facility for Individuals with Intellectual and Developmental Disabilities in Shreveport, Louisiana. He attended all four sessions of the Second Vatican Council in Rome between 1962 and 1965. Greco was also the supreme chaplain of the Knights of Columbus.

Retirement and legacy 
On May 10, 1973, Pope Paul VI accepted Greco's resignation as bishop of Alexandria. Charles Greco died on January 20, 1987, at age 92. Greco is honored with a statue of himself standing between two children at St. Mary's Residential Training School in Alexandria.

See also

References

1894 births
1987 deaths
American College of the Immaculate Conception alumni
Roman Catholic bishops of Alexandria
Catholic University of Leuven (1834–1968) alumni
Participants in the Second Vatican Council
People from Alexandria, Louisiana
People from Jefferson County, Mississippi
Religious leaders from Mississippi
20th-century Roman Catholic bishops in the United States
Catholics from Mississippi